The 2010 China League Two season is the 21st season since its establishment. League kicked off on 9 May 2010.

Group Stage Standings

North Group

 Round 1: Dalian Yiteng 2-2 Liaoning Tiger , Panjin Mengzun 0-1 Dalian Aerbin (9 May)
 Round 2: Tianjin Huochetou 2-0 Panjin Mengzun , Liaoning Tiger 0-1 Dalian Aerbin (15 May)
 Round 3: Dalian Aerbin 4-1 Dalian Yiteng , Liaoning Tiger 0-1 Tianjin Huochetou (22 May)
 Round 4: Dalian Yiteng 0-0 Tianjin Huochetou , Panjin Mengzun 0-0 Liaoning Tiger (29 May)
 Round 5: Dalian Yiteng 2-1 Panjin Mengzun , Tianjin Huochetou 0-1 Dalian Aerbin (5 June)
 Round 6: Dalian Aerbin 2-0 Panjin Mengzun , Liaoning Tiger 0-0 Dalian Yiteng (17 July)
 Round 7: Dalian Aerbin 0-0 Liaoning Tiger , Tianjin Huochetou 0-1 Panjin Mengzun (24 July)
 Round 8: Dalian Yiteng 3-0 Dalian Aerbin , Tianjin Huochetou 1-1 Liaoning Tiger (31 July)
 Round 9: Tianjin Huochetou 1-0 Dalian Yiteng , Liaoning Tiger 2-1 Panjin Mengzun (7 August)
 Round 10: Dalian Aerbin 4-1 Tianjin Huochetou , Panjin Mengzun 0-1 Dalian Yiteng (14 August)
 Round 11: Dalian Yiteng 2-1 Liaoning Tiger , Panjin Mengzun 0-4 Dalian Aerbin (21 August)
 Round 12: Panjin Mengzun 2-1 Tianjin Huochetou , Liaoning Tiger 2-1 Dalian Aerbin (28 August)
 Round 13: Dalian Aerbin 3-1 Dalian Yiteng , Liaoning Tiger 2-1 Tianjin Huochetou (4 September)
 Round 14: Dalian Yiteng 1-2 Tianjin Huochetou , Panjin Mengzun 1-1 Liaoning Tiger (11 September)
 Round 15: Dalian Yiteng 2-1 Panjin Mengzun , Tianjin Huochetou 1-0 Dalian Aerbin (18 September)
 Round 16:  Liaoning Tiger 0-5 Dalian Yiteng (25 September), Dalian Aerbin 2-1 Panjin Mengzun (26 September)
 Round 17: Dalian Aerbin 3-0 Liaoning Tiger , Tianjin Huochetou 4-0 Panjin Mengzun (2 October)
 Round 18: Dalian Yiteng 1-0 Dalian Aerbin , Tianjin Huochetou 0-1 Liaoning Tiger (9 October)
 Round 19: Tianjin Huochetou 0-1 Dalian Yiteng , Liaoning Tiger 0-4 Panjin Mengzun (16 October)
 Round 20: Dalian Aerbin 3-0 Tianjin Huochetou , Panjin Mengzun 2-1 Dalian Yiteng (23 October)

South Group

 Round 1: Wenzhou Provenza 2-2 Guizhou Zhicheng , Hubei CTGU Kangtian 0-2 Tianjin Songjiang  (9 May)
 Round 2: Wenzhou Provenza 1-1 Tianjin Songjiang , Sichuan F.C. 2-1 Hubei CTGU Kangtian (15 May)
 Round 3: Tianjin Songjiang 1-1 Guizhou Zhicheng , Wenzhou Provenza 0-1 Sichuan F.C. (22 May)
 Round 4: Hubei CTGU Kangtian 1-2 Wenzhou Provenza , Guizhou Zhicheng 1-1 Sichuan F.C. (29 May)
 Round 5: Guizhou Zhicheng 0-0 Hubei CTGU Kangtian , Sichuan F.C. 0-2 Tianjin Songjiang (5 June)
 Round 6: Tianjin Songjiang 3-0 Hubei CTGU Kangtian , Guizhou Zhicheng 3-1 Wenzhou Provenza (17 July)
 Round 7: Tianjin Songjiang 3-0 Wenzhou Provenza , Hubei CTGU Kangtian 1-1 Sichuan F.C. (24 July)
 Round 8: Guizhou Zhicheng 0-1 Tianjin Songjiang , Sichuan F.C. 0-0 Wenzhou Provenza (31 July)
 Round 9: Wenzhou Provenza 2-2 Hubei CTGU Kangtian , Sichuan F.C. 1-1 Guizhou Zhicheng (7 August)
 Round 10: Tianjin Songjiang 4-1 Sichuan F.C. (14 August), Hubei CTGU Kangtian 2-1 Guizhou Zhicheng (16 August)
 Round 11: Wenzhou Provenza 0-2 Guizhou Zhicheng , Hubei CTGU Kangtian 1-0 Tianjin Songjiang  (21 August)
 Round 12: Wenzhou Provenza 0-5 Tianjin Songjiang , Sichuan F.C. 0-0 Hubei CTGU Kangtian (28 August)
 Round 13: Tianjin Songjiang 0-0 Guizhou Zhicheng , Wenzhou Provenza 2-2 Sichuan F.C. (4 September)
 Round 14: Hubei CTGU Kangtian 2-1 Wenzhou Provenza , Guizhou Zhicheng 0-1 Sichuan F.C. (12 September)
 Round 15: Guizhou Zhicheng 0-0 Hubei CTGU Kangtian , Sichuan F.C. 0-1 Tianjin Songjiang (18 September)
 Round 16: Tianjin Songjiang 2-2 Hubei CTGU Kangtian , Guizhou Zhicheng 2-0 Wenzhou Provenza (25 September)
 Round 17: Tianjin Songjiang 2-1 Wenzhou Provenza , Hubei CTGU Kangtian 0-0 Sichuan F.C. (2 October)
 Round 18: Guizhou Zhicheng 1-1 Tianjin Songjiang , Sichuan F.C. 1-1 Wenzhou Provenza (9 October)
 Round 19: Wenzhou Provenza 0-0 Hubei CTGU Kangtian , Sichuan F.C. 0-1 Guizhou Zhicheng (16 October)
 Round 20: Tianjin Songjiang 2-1 Sichuan F.C., Hubei CTGU Kangtian 1-1 Guizhou Zhicheng (23 October)

Play-offs
Play-off finalists promotes to China League One.

First round

First leg

Second leg

Semi-finals / Promotion finals

First leg

Second leg

Third-place match

Champions final

Notes and references

External links
Official site 
News and results at Sohu 

3
China League Two seasons